Ernest Popplewell, Baron Popplewell, CBE (10 December 1899 – 11 August 1977) was a British Labour Party politician.

In the Labour landslide at the 1945 general election, Popplewell was elected as Member of Parliament for Newcastle upon Tyne West. In 1951 he was appointed a Commander of the Order of the British Empire (CBE).  After his retirement from the House of Commons at the 1966 general election, he was made a life peer as Baron Popplewell, of Sherburn-in-Elmet in the West Riding of the County of York on 6 June 1966.

References

1899 births
1977 deaths
Commanders of the Order of the British Empire
Labour Party (UK) MPs for English constituencies
Labour Party (UK) life peers
Ministers in the Attlee governments, 1945–1951
National Union of Railwaymen-sponsored MPs
UK MPs 1945–1950
UK MPs 1950–1951
UK MPs 1951–1955
UK MPs 1955–1959
UK MPs 1959–1964
UK MPs 1964–1966
UK MPs who were granted peerages
Life peers created by Elizabeth II